Saint Kitts and Nevis first participated at the Olympic Games in 1996, and have competed in every Summer Olympic Games since then. The country has never won an Olympic medal and has not competed at the Winter Olympic Games.
 
Saint Kitts and Nevis have competed only in athletics and have never won a medal.

Olympic overview

1996 Summer Olympics

The first year Saint Kitts and Nevis participated in the Olympics, they sent ten athletes, the most the country has ever sent. Kim Collins and Diane Francis both advanced to the quarterfinals of their events, in the 100 meter sprint and 400 meter dash respectively. They were both eliminated in the quarterfinals and did not advance to the semifinals.

The rest of Saint Kitts and Nevis' participants took part in relay races. The men's 4 × 100 relay team placed fourth in their heat with a time of 40.12 seconds, the women's 4 × 100 relay team received a DNF (did not finish), and the women's 4 × 400 relay team finished seventh in their heat with a time of 3:35.12 minutes. None of the relay teams advanced to the next round.

2000 Summer Olympics

Saint Kitts and Nevis only sent one male and one female athlete to the 2000 Summer Olympics, who both performed well. Kim Collins advanced to the semifinals in both the 100 meter and 200 meter sprints, but was eliminated from the 200 meter sprints. He advanced to the finals of the 100 meter sprint and placed seventh, with a time of 10.17. Valma Bass advanced to the semifinals in the 100 meter and 200 meter sprints, but was eliminated from both.

2004 Summer Olympics

For the second consecutive Olympics, Saint Kitts and Nevis sent one male and one female to compete in athletics at the 2004 Summer Olympics. Kim Collins once again made it to the finals of the 100 meter. He finished sixth in the 100 meter with a time of ten seconds. Collins was the oldest athlete to compete for Saint Kitts and Nevis at the age of 28. Tiandra Ponteen ran the 400 m dash, advancing to the semifinals. She finished fifth with a time of 51.33 seconds and did not advance to the finals.

2008 Summer Olympics

Saint Kitts and Nevis sent one male and three female athletes to the 2008 Summer Olympics, who all competed in athletics. Kim Collins competed in two events, and was the only athlete from Saint Kitts and Nevis to advance to the finals. Collins finished in sixth place in the 200 meters, with a time of 20.59 seconds

2012 Summer Olympics

Saint Kitts and Nevis sent seven athletes to the 2012 Summer Olympics. One athlete, the sprinter Tameka Williams, admitted prior to competing in the London Games that she took Blast Off Red, which is typically used to increase the performance of horses and greyhounds. It was announced on July 29 that she would not compete. Kim Collins, who has competed in every Olympics that Saint Kitts and Nevis has participated in, was not allowed to compete by his Olympic committee. Collins was required to stay in the Olympic village, but instead stayed with his wife (who was also his coach), closer to the track. The committee said he had violated team rules, and did not allow him to compete.

The 4 × 100 meter relay team, made up of—Antoine Adams, Delwayne Delaney, Brijesh Lawrence, Jason Rogers, and Lestrod Roland—set a national record for Saint Kitts and Nevis with a time of 38.41 seconds. They placed sixth and did not advance to the next round.

2016 Summer Olympics

Saint Kitts and Nevis had seven participants at the 2016 Summer Olympics, led by team captain Antoine Adams. At 40 years old, Kim Collins was the first 40-year old to run a sub 10 second 100-meter dash, for his fifth consecutive Olympic Games. He was the oldest sprinter at these Games. Collins advanced the furthest of any Saint Kitts and Nevis athlete, reaching the semifinals of the 100 meter dash. He finished sixth in his heat with a time of 10.12 seconds and did not advance to the finals.

Medal tables

Medals by Summer Games

Flagbearers 
Kim Collins is a three-time flag bearer for Saint Kitts and Nevis, the most of anyone from the country. He has qualified for all six of the Olympic Games that Saint Kitts and Nevis has participated in.

See also
 Saint Kitts and Nevis national athletics team

References

External links
 
 
 

 
Sports governing bodies in Saint Kitts and Nevis